Notiophilus aquaticus is a species of ground beetle native to the Palearctic and the Nearctic. In Europe, it is found in Andorra, Austria, Belarus, Belgium, Bosnia and Herzegovina, Great Britain including the Isle of Man, Bulgaria, Croatia, the Czech Republic, mainland Denmark, Estonia, the Faroe Islands, Finland, mainland France, Germany, Iceland, the Republic of Ireland.

Others are in mainland Italy, Kaliningrad, Latvia, Liechtenstein, Luxembourg, Moldova, Northern Ireland, North Macedonia, mainland Norway, Poland, Russia, Sardinia (doubtful), Sicily, Slovakia, Slovenia, mainland Spain, Sweden, Switzerland, the Netherlands, Ukraine and Yugoslavia.

References

External links
Global Biodiversity Information

Nebriinae
Beetles described in 1758
Taxa named by Carl Linnaeus